Liam Mac Cóil is an Irish language novelist, a critic, and an essayist.

Career
Born in Dublin in 1952, Liam Mac Cóil lives in the Gaeltacht of Ráth Cairn, County Meath. Before becoming a full-time writer he worked for a time at An Coiste Téarmaíochta. He is presently co-editor of the literary annual Bliainiris and director of the publishing house Carbad. He has written six novels as well as a writer's journal, Nótaí ón Lár (Notes from the Centre).

Early in his career, he published two translations from the Welsh, Tiocfaidh Lá (original title: Daw Dydd, a selection of writings by Welsh-language activist Ffred Ffransis) and Saibhreas Chnoic Chaspair (Trysor Bryniau Caspar, a young-adult novel by John Selwyn Lloyd). In 2010 he published a work of personal reflections on the composer Charles Villiers Stanford titled An Chláirseach agus an Choróin. His work has also appeared in the publications Comhar, Feasta and Aimsir Óg.

Awards and nominations 
Mac Cóil's debut novel, An Dochtúir Áthas, was shortlisted for the Irish Times Literature Prize for Fiction in 1995, becoming the first Irish-language novel to be so recognised. His third novel, Fontenoy, won the Gradam Uí Shúilleabháin (an annual prize for Irish-language books) in 2006.

Published novels
An Dochtúir Áthas (Doctor Joy), Leabhar Breac, 1995
An Claíomh Solais (The Sword of Light), Leabhar Breac, 1998
Fontenoy, Leabhar Breac, 2005
An Litir (The Letter), Leabhar Breac, 2012
I dTír Stráinséartha (In a Strange Land), Leabhar Breac, 2014
An Choill (The Wood), Leabhar Breac, 2016.
Bealach na Spáinneach (The Way of the Spanish) Leabhar Breac, 2020

Other published work
Tiocfaidh Lá, Carbad, 1977 (translation of Daw Dydd by Ffred Ffransis)
The Book of Blackrock, Carraig Books, 1977
Saibhreas Chnoic Chaspair, An Gúm, 1981 (translation of Trysor Bryniau Caspar by J. Selwyn Lloyd)
Toirealach Ó Cearúlláin, Leabhar Breac, 1999
Nótaí ón Lár, Leabhar Breac, 2000
Bliainiris, Carbad, 2000 -2007

Notes

External links
 Leabhar Breac Publisher's Site

References 
Gaelchultúr Book Club, February 2013 (https://www.youtube.com/watch?v=TEQ0a2o04LQ)

Irish novelists
Irish-language writers
Living people
1952 births
20th-century Irish writers
21st-century Irish writers
Writers from Dublin (city)
People from County Meath
Irish male novelists